George Eustis may refer to:
 George Eustis Jr., American lawyer and politician
 George Eustis Sr., his father, chief justice of the Louisiana Supreme Court